Dave's World is an American sitcom television series, created by Fred Barron, that aired on CBS from September 20, 1993, to June 20, 1997. The series is based on the writing of Miami Herald columnist Dave Barry.

Plot
The show focuses on the daily trials and tribulations of columnist Dave Barry (Harry Anderson) and his wife, Beth (DeLane Matthews), along with their sons, Tommy (Zane Carney) and Willie (Andrew Ducote). Dave worked at the Miami Record-Dispatch (a fictionalized version of the Miami Herald, where Barry worked in real life), where Kenny Beckett (Shadoe Stevens) was his editor, although Dave typically worked from home, where Mia (J.C. Wendel) was his assistant. Neighbor Sheldon Baylor (Meshach Taylor) was a successful plastic surgeon and Dave's best friend from high school. Starting in the second season, the Barrys hired Eric (Patrick Warburton) to do some work on their house, which led to Eric and Mia dating and eventually moving next door to the Barrys and getting married. Later in the series, Dave completes a book based on his and his friends' lives during the 1960s, and Shel loses all of his money when his business manager runs off. Kenny is also fired from the newspaper and becomes a weatherman.

Setting and background
The show was set in Miami, Florida (Barry's actual city of residence), and was based on Barry's books Dave Barry's Greatest Hits and Dave Barry Turns 40.

The show's theme song was a version of Billy Joel's "You May Be Right" sung by Southside Johnny; however, it is not used in the DVD releases (see below).

During the run of the show, the real Dave Barry divorced his wife, Beth.

Cast

Main
Harry Anderson as Dave Barry
DeLane Matthews as Beth Barry
Shadoe Stevens as Kenny Beckett
J.C. Wendel as Mia
Zane Carney as Tommy Barry
Andrew Ducote as Willie Barry
Meshach Taylor as Dr. Sheldon "Shel" Baylor
Patrick Warburton as Eric (seasons 3–4)

Recurring
Tammy Lauren as Julie (season 1)
Eugene Roche as Eric, Jr. (season 3)
Bea Arthur as Mel Bloom (season 4)

Episodes

Season 1 (1993–94)

Season 2 (1994–95)

Season 3 (1995–96)

Season 4 (1996–97)

Home media
CBS DVD (distributed by Paramount) released the first two seasons of Dave's World on DVD in Region 1 in 2008 and 2009. The theme song for the DVD releases was replaced with a generic rock track.

On July 24, 2012, Season 3 was released as a Manufacture-on-Demand (MOD) release via Amazon.com's CreateSpace program.

Ratings
The show was originally a hit for CBS when it aired on Monday night.  However, by the third season, it was moved to Wednesdays, and the ratings declined. By the fourth season, the show had moved to the "Friday night death slot" and the resulting drop in ratings led to the program's cancellation.

References

External links

1990s American sitcoms
1993 American television series debuts
1997 American television series endings
CBS original programming
Television shows based on books
Television series about families
Television series by CBS Studios
Television shows set in Miami
English-language television shows